Wang Shiying (November 13, 1905 – March 26, 1968) was a People's Republic of China politician. He was born in Hongtong County, Linfen, Shanxi. He was a graduate of the Whampoa Military Academy. He participated in the Northern Expedition, Second Sino-Japanese War and Chinese Civil War. He was a delegate to the 1st National People's Congress and 2nd National People's Congress. He was governor of his home province.

He was interrogated by radical elements during the Cultural Revolution and died during the struggle in 1968.

References

1905 births
1968 deaths
Governors of Shanxi
Delegates to the 1st National People's Congress
Delegates to the 2nd National People's Congress
Members of the Standing Committee of the 3rd Chinese People's Political Consultative Conference
Members of the Standing Committee of the 4th Chinese People's Political Consultative Conference